Dubbin (also known as “dubbing” in the USA) is a traditional  product used to soften, condition and waterproof leather. It consists of natural wax, oil and tallow. Dubbin has been used since medieval times to waterproof and soften leather goods. It is different from saddle soap used to clean and lightly condition leather, or shoe polish, which is used to impart shine and colour to it.

Dubbin can be made with beeswax; fish oil; and lard, and can also include mink oil.

The name dubbin is a contraction of the gerund dubbing, describing the action of applying the wax to leather.

References 
Citations

Other references
 - Material Safety Data Sheet - Joseph Lyddy dubbin.
 - Opportunities for industry and the safe investment of capital (1859) Rothman, E., Lippincott, USA
Jarell, T.D., Holman, H.P., (1923) Effects of Treating Materials and Outdoor Exposure upon Water Resistance and Tensile Strength of Cotton Duck, Industrial and Engineering Chemistry, Bureau of Chemistry, Washington.
Norton, F.J., (1945) Waterproofing Treatments of Materials, Patent Number 2386259, Serial Number 452,885, United States Patent Office.
Holman, H.P., Jarrell, T.D., (date unknown) The Effects of Waterproofing Materials and Outdoor Exposure upon the Tensile Strength of Cotton Yarn, Industrial and Engineering Chemistry, 15(3), US Department of Agriculture, Washington.
Stewart, C.S., (1977) Factors Affecting the Cellulolytic Activity of Rumen Contents, Applied and Environmental Microbiology, pp. 497–502

External links
Johan's Dubbin Page - a leathercrafter's perspective of this leather conditioner.

Footwear accessories